Thomas Hardy was a professional rugby league footballer who played in the 1930s and 1940s.

Playing career

County honours
Thomas Hardy won a cap playing  for Yorkshire while at Castleford in the 10-10 draw with Lancashire at Leeds' stadium on 26 October 1938.

County League appearances
Thomas Hardy played in Castleford's victory in the Yorkshire County League during the 1938–39 season.

References

External links
Search for "Hardy" at rugbyleagueproject.org
Tom Hardy Memory Box Search at archive.castigersheritage.com
Tommy Hardy Memory Box Search at archive.castigersheritage.com

Castleford Tigers players
English rugby league players
Place of birth missing
Place of death missing
Rugby league five-eighths
Wakefield Trinity players
Year of birth missing
Year of death missing
Yorkshire rugby league team players